Bashir Barghuthi (1931–2000) was a Palestinian Communist leader and journalist.

Background
Barghouti was born in the village of Dayr Ghassana in the Ramallah Subdistrict. He earned a BA degree in Economics from the American University in Cairo in 1956.

Career
Living in exile in Jordan, he founded the central organ of the Jordanian Communist Party al-Jamahir (The Masses) and joined the General Union of Palestinian Students (GUPS). In 1957 the paper was closed by Jordanian authorities, and Barghouti was incarcerated the Al-Jaffar prison. When freed in 1965, he was refused a journalist license by the Jordanian government, but continued to write under an assumed name. After 1967 he opposed the right of king Hussein of Jordan to speak on behalf of Palestinians.

In 1974 he returned to the West Bank via family reunification, and became a leading figure of the Jordanian Communist Party there. He founded the newspaper al-Fajr (Dawn), which he edited from 1975 to 1977. In February 1977 there was a political rift between him and Fatah, and Barghouti left his editorship of al-Fajr. In February 1978 he founded the newspaper al-Tali'a (The Vanguard) in Jerusalem.

Barghouti was put in house arrest by the Israelis from August 1980 – 1982. In 1982 the JCP branches in the West Bank were converted into the  Palestinian Communist Party. Barghouti became the General Secretary of PCP.

In 1987, after PCP having joined the Palestine Liberation Organization, Barghouti was inducted into the PLO Executive Committee. Barghouti was an important figure during the First Palestinian Intifada, and he formed the first popular committee. He was able to establish an agreement between Fatah and PFLP. He was a key figure during the Oslo peace process.

In June 1996 he was appointed Minister of Industry in the first Palestinian National Authority government. In 1997 he suffered a severe stroke. He was then appointed Minister of State (a largely symbolic position).

Barghouti died on September 9, 2000.

References

External links
A biography 
A biography

1931 births
2000 deaths
Palestine Liberation Organization members
Jordanian Communist Party politicians
Palestinian People's Party politicians
Palestinian journalists
State ministers of Palestine
People from Bani Zeid al-Gharbia
20th-century journalists
Palestinian people imprisoned by Jordan